Lumretuzumab (INN; development code RG7116) is a humanized monoclonal antibody designed for the treatment of cancer.

This drug was developed by Genentech/Roche.

References 

Monoclonal antibodies